The following is a list of Chinese films first released in 2010. There were 91 Chinese feature films released in China in 2010.

Highest-grossing films
The following are the 10 highest-grossing Chinese films released in China in 2010.

Films released

See also
2010 in China

References

External links
IMDb list of Chinese films

Chinese
Films
2010